The 1961 New Mexico State Aggies football team represented New Mexico State University during the 1961 NCAA University Division football season. In their fourth year under head coach Warren B. Woodson, the Aggies compiled a 5–4–1 record (2–1 against conference opponents) and finished in third place in the Border Conference.

The team's statistical leaders included Ron Logback with 796 passing yards, Preacher Pilot with 1,278 rushing yards, and R. Cassell with 519 receiving yards. For the third consecutive year, a New Mexico State back won the NCAA rushing title, Pervis Atkins in 1959, Bob Gaiters in 1960, and Preacher Pilot in 1961.

Head coach Warren Woodson was later inducted into the College Football Hall of Fame.

Schedule

References

New Mexico State
New Mexico State Aggies football seasons
New Mexico State Aggies football